Karun Khuzestan Football Club is an Iranian football club based in Ahvaz, Iran. They currently compete in the 2013–14 Iran Football's 2nd Division.

Season-by-Season
The table below shows the achievements of the club in various competitions.

See also
 2013–14 Iran Football's 2nd Division

References

Football clubs in Iran
Association football clubs established in 2007
2007 establishments in Iran